Admiral Sir Anthony Storrs Morton  (6 November 1923 – 6 May 2006) was a senior Royal Navy officer and Vice-Chief of the Defence Staff.

Naval career
Educated at Loretto School, Morton was commissioned into the Royal Navy in 1941 during the Second World War. He became Commanding Officer of the frigate  as well as Captain of the 20th Frigate Squadron in 1964, Senior Naval Officer Northern Ireland in 1968 and Senior Naval Member at the Royal College of Defence Studies in 1971. He went on to be Assistant Chief of Defence Staff (Policy) in 1973 and Flag Officer First Flotilla in 1975. He was appointed Vice-Chief of the Defence Staff in 1977 and Vice Chief of the Naval Staff in 1978.

In 1980 he was appointed UK Military Representative to NATO; he retired in 1983.

In retirement he became King of Arms of the Order of the British Empire as well as Rear-Admiral and then Vice-Admiral of the United Kingdom.

He died in 2006 after a long illness.

References

|-

|-

|-

|-

|-

1923 births
2006 deaths
Knights Commander of the Order of the Bath
Knights Grand Cross of the Order of the British Empire
People educated at Loretto School, Musselburgh
Royal Navy admirals
Royal Navy officers of World War II